The Addario Lung Cancer Medical Institute (ALCMI voiced as Alchemy) is a patient-founded non-profit research consortium established to help make lung cancer a survivable disease.  Founded by advanced stage lung cancer patient Bonnie J. Addario, founder of the Bonnie J. Addario Lung Cancer Foundation, .

History
ALCMI was incorporated in early 2008, and in September 2008 recruited Steven Young as president and chief operating officer (former executive director, Multiple Myeloma Research Consortium).  In January 2009 ALCMI's Scientific Leadership Board was established, composed of many of the world's leading lung cancer researchers, clinicians and scientists.  On July 31, 2009, ALCMI entered a diagnostic screening and clinical research agreement with Response Genetics, Inc. for the molecular testing and banking of advanced stage lung cancer tissue samples.  In addition, ALCMI has partnered with both academic institutions, such as UCSF, NYU, Vanderbilt University, UC Davis, the Dana–Farber Cancer Institute, and the University of Southern California, and community hospitals such as Hoag Hospital, Lahey Clinic and Alta Bates Summit Medical Center.  ALCMI has established an international biorepository.

Executive board
 President & COO - Steven Young
 CEO - Tony Addario

References

External links
 

Cancer organizations based in the United States
Medical and health organizations based in California